is a 1924 short French silent comedy film directed by Abel Gance and starring Max Linder. The French title translates into English as "Help!". The film is also known as The Haunted House in some reference books. The film was made on a dare, with Gance filming the entire project in three days, with the help of his friend, actor Max Linder. Linder had just returned to France after several years of trying to start an acting career in Canada.

Max Linder, depressed since his service in World War I, had earlier entered into a suicide pact with his younger wife in 1924, the year after they were married, but the attempt failed and the event was hushed up. Their second attempt succeeded however in 1925, and the pair succumbed to an overdose of poison and blood loss from slitting their wrists, leaving behind a very young daughter Maud. Quentin Tarantino included a reference/ homage to Linder in his 2009 film, Inglourious Basterds.

Plot 
The boastful Count Maulette dares some guests in a private club to spend one hour in a haunted house he knows of. A young newlywed named Max takes on the challenge, and they bet a thousand francs on it. Max must stay in the castle from 11 PM until midnight in order to win the bet. The Count arranges for Max to have a bell he can ring for help, but if he rings the bell, he loses the bet.

After Max is locked inside, he is assaulted by a wild barrage of seemingly weird supernatural events (a mannequin comes to life and assaults him, men in skeleton costumes prance about, wild animals wander the corridors and ghosts seem to fly about). Finally, just as he is about to win the bet, the phone rings and Max is told that his wife back home is being threatened by an intruder. Panic-stricken, Max rings the bell minutes before midnight to run to his wife's defense, and therein loses the bet. The audience later discovers it was the Count calling him on the phone, pretending Max's wife was in danger.

Cast
 Max Linder - Max
 Jean Toulout - Count Maulette
 Gina Palerme - Edith
 Gaston Modot

Criticism
Critic Christopher Workman writes the film's "horrific incidents.....none of it particularly funny or scary, employ props, techniques and effects that were already old hat in 1924 --- fast motion, slow motion, wire work, superimpositions, stunt doubles on trampolines, men in ghost and skeleton costumes, a man on stilts, etc....".

References

External links
 

1924 films
French black-and-white films
French haunted house films
French silent short films
Films directed by Abel Gance
1920s comedy horror films
1924 horror films
French comedy horror films
1924 comedy films
Silent comedy horror films
1920s French films